Ramshin (also Romanized as Rāmshīn; also known as Pūnam) is a village in Pirakuh Rural District, in the Central District of Jowayin County, Razavi Khorasan Province, Iran. At the 2006 census, its population was 403, in 137 families.

References 

Populated places in Joveyn County